John Paulet, 14th Marquess of Winchester (3 June 1801 – 4 July 1887), styled Earl of Wiltshire until 1843, was a British peer and soldier.

Life
Born at Amport House in 1801 as the eldest son of the 13th Marquess of Winchester, he was educated at Eton. On 10 April 1817, he was commissioned a cornet in the 10th Light Dragoons, bought a lieutenancy on 16 November 1820, and a captaincy in the 35th Regiment of Foot on 12 June 1823. He exchanged into the 8th Hussars the same year. On 9 June 1826, he bought a majority in the regiment (Lord Brudenell, later Lord Cardigan, got his captaincy), and purchased an unattached lieutenant-colonelcy of infantry on 30 December 1826. On 14 April 1837, he exchanged from unattached half-pay to replace Lord Bingham (later Lord Lucan) as lieutenant-colonel of the 17th Lancers, and then retired from the Army the next day. On 29 June 1842, he was appointed colonel of the North Hampshire Militia after the death of Lord Rodney, much to the chagrin of the regimental lieutenant-colonel, Peter Hawker, who aspired to the post.

Paulet succeeded his father as Marquess of Winchester in 1843. He was appointed a deputy lieutenant of Hampshire on 31 March 1847, and succeeded the Duke of Wellington as Lord Lieutenant of Hampshire in 1852.

Family

On 29 November 1855, Winchester married Hon. Mary Montagu (1828–1868), daughter of Henry Robinson-Montagu, 6th Baron Rokeby, at St James', Westminster. Together they had three children:

 Augustus John Henry Beaumont Paulet, Earl of Wiltshire (6 February 1858 – 11 December 1899)
 Lady Lillian Mary (26 July 1859 – 11 November 1952): married as his first wife, Randolph Gordon Erskine-Wemyss, Laird of Wemyss Castle and Chief of Clan Wemyss. They had a son Michael who married Lady Victoria Cavendish-Bentinck, daughter of William Cavendish-Bentinck, 6th Duke of Portland, and a daughter Mary who married Lt. Ernest Caswell of the Grenadier Guards.
 Lord Henry William Montagu Paulet (30 October 1862 – 28 June 1962)

He died on 4 July 1887 and was succeeded by his elder son, Augustus.

References 

1801 births
1887 deaths
8th King's Royal Irish Hussars officers
10th Royal Hussars officers
35th Regiment of Foot officers
British Militia officers
Deputy Lieutenants of Hampshire
Lord-Lieutenants of Hampshire
People educated at Eton College
14